Goitseone Seleka (born 10 August 1988) is a Botswana athlete competing primarily in the 400 metres. She participated in the 4 × 400 metres relay at the 2013 World Championships without qualifying for the final. Goitseone is born and bred in a village called Nkange.

Her personal best in the event is 53.11 seconds set in Porto Novo in 2012.

Competition record

References

1988 births
Living people
Botswana female sprinters
Place of birth missing (living people)
African Games silver medalists for Botswana
African Games medalists in athletics (track and field)
Athletes (track and field) at the 2011 All-Africa Games
Athletes (track and field) at the 2015 African Games